National Investment and Infrastructure Fund Limited (NIIFL) is an investment platform for international and Indian investors anchored by the Government of India. The objective behind creating this organisation was to catalyse capital into the country and support its growth needs across sectors of importance.

In Union Budget 2015-16, India’s then Finance Minister, Arun Jaitley announced the creation of NIIFL. It was proposed to be established as an Alternative Investment Fund with an inflow of ₹20,000 crore from the Government of India, with their commitment being 49% of the total corpus. NIIFL was approved in August 2015 by the Department of Economic Affairs. First meeting of its governing council was held in December 2015 further to which it was registered with SEBI as Category II Alternative Investment Fund. In June 2016, Finance Ministry announced that they appointed Sujoy Bose as Chief Executive Office of NIIFL who was then the Director and Global Co-Head, Infrastructure and Natural Resources International Finance Corporation (IFC).

As of September 2020, the NIIFL manages funds of over USD$4.34 billion.

History 
The Government of India founded the National Investment and Infrastructure Fund Limited (NIIFL) in February 2015 as a sovereign-anchored fund. Its creation was announced in the Union Budget of 2015-16 by the then Finance Minister Arun Jaitley. In October 2016, Sujoy Bose was appointed as the Managing Director and CEO of NIIF. In December 2020, NIIFL achieved the final close of its infrastructure Fund, NIIF Master Fund USD 2.34 billion.

Leadership 
The Governing Council of the National Investment and Infrastructure Fund (NIIF) is chaired by the Hon’ble Finance Minister of India and has members from corporate bodies, investments and policy sectors. The Governing Council meets once a year and provides suggestions of the overall strategic decisions of the NIIFL. The Governing Council is currently chaired by Hon’ble Finance Minister of India Nirmala Sitharaman, Finance Minister of India. Among the other council members are Debasish Panda (Secretary of Financial Services), Ajay Seth (Secretary, Department of Economic Affairs), Dinesh Khara (Chairman, State Bank of India), Hemendra Kothari (Chairman, DSP Group), T. V. Mohandas Pai (Chairman, Manipal Global Education). 

NIIFL’s Board of Directors establishes and reviews the business strategy that guides the business affairs of the organization. It is composed of shareholder representatives and/or nominees and independent directors. Sujoy Bose is the Managing Director and CEO of the organization. Erstwhile Managing Director – India of Temasek, Padmanabh Sinha is the Executive Director and CIO – Growth Equity, managing the Strategic Opportunities Fund. Prakash Rao is the Executive Director and CIO for Indirect Investments, a financial services veteran with over three decades of experience. He is also one of the founding members of NIIF. Ambalika Banerji is the Executive Director – Direct Investments.

Funds
NIIF manages three funds: Master Fund, Fund of Funds and Strategic Fund. The funds were set up to make investments in India by raising capital from domestic and international institutional investors.

Master Fund
The Master Fund is an infrastructure fund with the objective of primarily investing in operating assets in the core infrastructure sectors such as roads, ports, airports, power etc. The Fund made its final close in December 2020, achieving a size of INR equivalent of USD 2.34 billion, exceeding its target of USD 2.1 billion.

Fund of Funds 
The Fund of Funds anchor and/or invest in funds managed by fund managers who have good track records of delivering returns to investors. The Fund invests in several sectors including green energy, social infrastructure, mid-income and affordable housing, technology, and others.

Strategic Opportunities Fund
Strategic Opportunities Fund invests in growth equity and provides long-term capital to strategic and growth-oriented sectors in the country with the aim to build domestic leaders.

Investors in the Fund
The government of India has anchored the NIIFL funds and is a 49% investor in each of the funds managed by NIIFL. 

NIIF Master Fund announced its final close in December 2020 at USD 2.34 billion. Its investors include the Government of India, Abu Dhabi Investment Authority (ADIA), Temasek, Ontario Teachers’ Pension Plan, AustralianSuper, CPP Investments, PSP Investments, US International Development Finance Corporation, and domestic institutional investors including HDFC Group, ICICI Bank, Kotak Mahindra Life, and Axis Bank. 

NIIF Fund of Funds is a USD 600 million fund with investors including the Government of India, the Asian Infrastructure Investment Bank, the Asian Development Bank, and the New Development Bank.

Investments

NIIF Master Fund
In February 2018, Master Fund created its first platform along with DP World to invest in the ports and logistics sector in India. Together, NIIF and DP world announced the investment of $3 billion in the platform. In March 2018, Hindustan Infralog, the joint venture platform between DP World and the NIIF announced that it bought 90% stake in the logistics firm Continental Warehousing. In June 2022, NIIF expanded its partnership with DP World through an investment of around INR 2,250 crore (approximately USD 300 million) to acquire 22.5% in Hindustan Ports Pvt Ltd (HPPL). Hindustan Ports is a wholly-owned subsidiary of DP World. The transaction is under customary completion conditions and is expected to be closed by Q1 CY2023. 

In February 2019, Master Fund announced a partnership with BII (formerly known as CDC Group) and EverSource Capital (a joint venture between Everstone Capital and Lightsource BP) to cumulatively invest USD 300 million in Ayana Renewable Power, the renewable energy platform founded by BII. In December 2020, all three investors injected further capital into the platform. Following this, Master Fund became the majority shareholder in the company. In January 2022, Ayana Renewable Power announced that its portfolio has crossed 1 GWac of operational renewable energy capacity.

In October 2019, Master Fund and Energy Efficiency Services Limited (EESL) announced the creation of a joint venture, IntelliSmart Infrastructure Private Limited, to implement, finance and operate the smart meter roll-out program of power distribution companies. 

In November 2020, NIIF announced the acquisition of Essel Devanahalli Tollway (22 km six lane toll road in the state of Karnataka) and Essel Dichpally Tollway (60 km four lane toll road in the state of Telangana) through the Master Fund. These roads are managed by Athaang Infrastructure, NIIF’s proprietary roads platform. In 2022, NIIF announced the acquisition of another two roads in Jammu & Kashmir to be managed by Athaang Infrastructure - Navayuga Quazigund Expressway Private Limited and SP Jammu Udhampur Highway Limited.

NIIF Fund of Funds 
In April 2018, NIIF partnered with the UK government to launch the Green Growth Equity Fund (GGEF) under its Fund of Funds to invest in renewable energy, clean transportation, water and waste management, and other related sectors in India.

NIIF Fund of Funds and the UK Government committed GBP 120 million each into the Fund. GGEF announced its final close in January 2022 at USD 741 million, making it one of the largest single-country funds focused on climate change in emerging markets. 

In October 2018, NIIF Fund of Funds invested INR 660 crore in HDFC Capital Affordable Real Estate – 2 (H-CARE 2), an investment platform, managed by HDFC Capital Advisors, a wholly-owned subsidiary of HDFC Ltd.  

In October 2020, NIIF Funds of Funds committed to Somerset Indus Healthcare India Fund, an affordable healthcare fund.

In April 2022, NIIF Fund of Funds made its first commitment to a venture fund, YourNest Innovative Products VC Fund III. It made a USD 15 million commitment and was the anchor investor in the Fund. 

NIIF Fund of Funds has also invested in Multiples Private Equity Fund III managed by Multiples Alternate Asset Management Pvt. Limited focusing on the mid-market space and in Arpwood Partners Fund I, which focuses on the mid-market buyout/control segment.

NIIF Strategic Opportunities Fund
In October 2018, NIIF announced the acquisition of IDFC Infrastructure Finance Limited (IDFC-IFL), a Non- Banking Finance Company registered with the Reserve Bank of India as an Infrastructure Debt Fund. This acquisition was made by NIIF’s Strategic Opportunities Fund. The Fund incubated Aseem Infrastructure Finance Limited (AIFL) in 2020, an Infrastructure Financing Company that can lend across the project life cycle. As of FY22, the two entities had jointly disbursed over INR 10,000 crores. 

On 22 November 2020, the Union Cabinet approved ₹6,000 crore investment by the Government of India into Aseem Infrastructure Finance Limited and NIIF Infrastructure Finance Limited as part of Atmanirbhar Bharat. Additionally, in 2022, Sumitomo Mitsui Banking Corporation (SMBC), a Japanese Bank also invested in AIFL. 

In April 2021, the Strategic Opportunities Fund invested INR 2,100 crore in Manipal Hospitals, one of India’s largest multi-speciality healthcare providers. The Strategic Opportunities Fund made its next investment in May 2022 in Ather Energy, an electric two-wheeler company. This was its first direct investment in the manufacturing sector and in electric mobility, both areas of national importance given India’s green mission and decarbonisation goals.

References

External links 

 

Investment in India
Investment funds
Sovereign wealth funds